Vulpoxena dentata is a species of moth of the family Tortricidae. It is found in Napo Province, Ecuador.

The wingspan is 15 mm. The ground colour of the forewings is yellowish cream, tinged with pale ochreous along the costa and dorsum and basally. The costal strigulae (fine streaks) and markings are brownish ferruginous. The hindwings are cream.

Etymology
The species name refers to the thorns of the sacculus and is derived from Latin dentatus (meaning toothed).

References

Moths described in 2007
Euliini
Moths of South America
Taxa named by Józef Razowski